Sali Verdha (10 January 1918 – 31 May 2009) was a distinguished World War 2 veteran who joined the ranks of the anti-fascist movement "Çeta e Pezës" and later led the 12th Shock Brigade which fought for the liberation of Pukë and Shkodër.

Career
After the war, Verdha was appointed as director of Albania's National Railways, a post which he held from 1950-1962. He served as Chairman of the Durrës Committee from 1962-1968. During this time he was elected as a member of the Albanian Parliament for two terms (1966-1974). In the following years, he would serve as special advisor of electrification in the Adil Çarçani government and was later appointed as Deputy Minister of Transportation. He has authored several wartime memoirs.

Memoirs 
  (1969)
  (1978)
  (1997)
  (2003)
  (2003)

References

Institution heads from Kavajë
Parliament members from Kavajë
1918 births
2009 deaths